Darnell Tobias Jack Johnson (born 3 September 1998) is an English professional footballer who plays as a defender for EFL League One club Fleetwood Town.

Club career
After featuring in friendly games ahead of the 2018–19 season, he signed a three-year contract with Leicester City in August 2018. He moved on loan to Scottish Premiership club Hibernian on 31 January 2019, for the rest of the 2018–19 season. Johnson made his first appearance for Hibernian in a 2–0 defeat against Celtic on 6 February. He was subsequently suspended for two matches for a challenge he made on Emilio Izaguirre during that match.

On 28 September 2020 he went to Wigan Athletic on loan until 4 January 2021.

After the end of his loan spell at Wigan, he went on loan to AFC Wimbledon from 25 January 2021 until the end of the season

In June 2021, it was announced that Johnson would be released from Leicester City upon expiry of his contract at the end of the season.

On 2 August 2021, Johnson signed for EFL League One club Fleetwood Town on a two-year contract.

International career
In November 2013, Johnson was captain of the England under-16 team against Northern Ireland in the Victory Shield. Johnson was part of the England under-19 team that won the 2017 UEFA European Under-19 Championship, playing the full game against Portugal in the final.

In August 2017, Johnson scored for the England under-20 team against the Netherlands.

Personal life
Johnson is the godson of former Leicester City and England player Emile Heskey.

Career statistics

Honours
England U19
UEFA European Under-19 Championship: 2017

References

1998 births
Living people
English footballers
Leicester City F.C. players
Hibernian F.C. players
Wigan Athletic F.C. players
AFC Wimbledon players
Fleetwood Town F.C. players
England youth international footballers
Association football defenders
Scottish Professional Football League players
English Football League players
Place of birth missing (living people)